Leif Westerberg (born 28 August 1974) is a Swedish professional golfer.

Westerberg was born in Stockholm and turned professional in 1997. He has played predominantly on Europe's second tier Challenge Tour where he has won two tournaments. He has graduated from the Challenge Tour twice, in 2004 and 2007, when he finished 7th and 5th respectively on the end of season rankings. Both in 2005 and 2008 he failed to win enough money to retain his card on the top level European Tour, although he came through qualifying school in 2005 to regain his playing status for the 2006 season, when he finished a career high of 131st on the Order of Merit.

Amateur wins
1992 Boys Amateur Championship

Professional wins (3)

Challenge Tour wins (2)

Challenge Tour playoff record (0–1)

Nordic Golf League wins (1)

Team appearances
Amateur
Jacques Léglise Trophy (representing the Continent of Europe): 1992
European Amateur Team Championship (representing Sweden): 1993, 1995
St Andrews Trophy (representing the Continent of Europe): 1994
Eisenhower Trophy (representing Sweden): 1996

See also
2005 European Tour Qualifying School graduates
2007 Challenge Tour graduates

External links

Leif Westerberg at golfdata.se 

Swedish male golfers
Oklahoma State Cowboys golfers
European Tour golfers
Golfers from Stockholm
1974 births
Living people